Surrounded By Criminals is the debut album released by the Ghetto Twiinz. It was released on December 17, 1995 by Big Boy Records and featured music production by Leroy " Precise" Edwards with music instruments performed by David "D-Funk" Faulk. Charles "Big Boy" Temple was the executive producer. The album was mastered by Brian "Big Bass" Gardner.  It found minor success, making it to #37 on the Top R&B/Hip-Hop Albums chart and #48 on the Top Heatseekers Billboard Charts. In March 1996

Track listing
"Surrounded"-1:10  
"Sho No Luv"- 4:12  
"Let's Get This Shit STR-8"- 3:40  
"So Hard to Say Goodbye"- 4:27  
"Got It on My Mind"- 3:15  
"Mamma's Hurtin'"- 4:20  
"Die Nigga, Die"- 3:42  
"I'ma Do U N"- 3:13  
"Lil' Shorty"- 0:37  
"Four Treats in One"- 3:13  
"I Ain't Dyin', I Ain't Lyin'"- 4:51  
"Mamma's Hurtin'" (Radio Edit)- 3:53  
"Die Nigga, Die" (Chopped & Screwed)- 4:24

References

1995 debut albums
Ghetto Twiinz albums